In organic chemistry, organophosphates (also known as phosphate esters, or OPEs) are a class of organophosphorus compounds with the general structure , a central phosphate molecule with alkyl or aromatic substituents.  They can be considered as esters of phosphoric acid. 

Like most functional groups, organophosphates occur in a diverse range of forms, with important examples including key biomolecules such as DNA, RNA and ATP, as well as many insecticides, herbicides, nerve agents and flame retardants. OPEs have been widely used in various products as flame retardants, plasticizers, and performance additives to engine oil. The popularity of OPEs as flame retardants came as a substitution for the highly regulated brominated flame retardants. The low cost of production and compatibility to diverse polymers made OPEs to be widely used in industry including textile, furniture, electronics as plasticizers and flame retardants. These compounds are added to the final product physically rather than by chemical bond. Due to this, OPEs leak into the environment more readily through volatilization, leaching, and abrasion. OPEs have been detected in diverse environmental compartments such as air, dust, water, sediment, soil and biota samples at higher frequency and concentration.

Synthesis
Alcoholysis of 
Phosphorus oxychloride reacts readily with alcohols to give organophosphates. This is the dominate industrial route and is responsible for almost all organophosphate production.

Esterification of phosphoric acid
In stark contrast to carboxylic acids, phosphoric acid does not readily esterify with alcohols. The use of activating species such as trichloroacetonitrile or acetic anhydride permit mono-esters to be formed, but tri-substituted organophosphates cannot be made in this way.

Oxidation of phosphite esters
Organophosphites can be easily oxidised to give organophosphates. This might normally be considered a specialised method for academic labs, however large quantities of organophosphites are produced as antioxidant stabilisers for plastics, with their gradual oxidation forming organophosphates in the human environment.

Phosphorylation

The formation of organophosphates is an important part of biochemistry and living systems achieve this using a variety of enzymes. Phosphorylation is essential to the processes of both anaerobic and aerobic respiration, which involve the production of adenosine triphosphate (ATP), the "high-energy" exchange medium in the cell.

Properties
The phosphate esters bearing OH groups are acidic and partially deprotonated in aqueous solution. For example, DNA and RNA are polymers of the type . Polyphosphates also form esters; an important example of an ester of a polyphosphate is ATP, which is the monoester of triphosphoric acid.

OPEs have a central phosphate molecular group. In the case of organophosphate (OP) triesters, these are three ester bonds with alkyl or aromatic substituents. However, OP diesters are distinct from the triesters as one of the alkyl ester groups is replaced by a hydroxyl group, making OP diesters phosphoric acids. The wide variety of substitutes used in organophosphate esters results in great variations in physicochemical properties, varying from highly polar to very hydrolysis resistant characteristics. OPEs exhibit a wide range of octanol water partitioning coefficient where log Kow values range from -0.98 up to 10.6. The predominant OPEs used as flame retardants and plasticizers have a positive log Kow values ranging between 1.44 and 9.49 signifying hydrophobicity. Thus, owing to this hydrophobicity OPEs are presumptively bioaccumulated and biomagnified in aquatic ecosystems. Laboratory experiments had shown that the non-halogenated OPEs are prone to photolysis, while the chlorinated OPEs such as TCEP and TCPP, however, seemed to be resistant to degradation by sunlight.

In nature

Guanitoxin is a naturally occurring organophosphate produced by cyanobacteria.

The detection of OPEs in the air as far away as Antarctica at concentrations around 1 ng/m3  suggests their persistence in air, and their potential for long-range transport. OPEs were measured in high frequency in air and water and widely distributed in northern hemisphere. The chlorinated OPEs (TCEP, TCIPP, TDCIPP) in urban sampling sites and non-halogenated like TBOEP in rural areas respectively were frequently measured in the environment across multiple sites. In the Laurentian Great Lakes total OPEs concentrations were found to be 2–3 orders of magnitude higher than concentrations of brominated flame retardants measured in similar air. Waters from rivers in Germany, Austria, and Spain have been consistently recorded for TBOEP and TCIPP at highest concentrations. From these studies, it is clear that OPE concentrations in both air and water samples are often orders of magnitude higher than other flame retardants, and that concentrations are largely dependent on sampling location, with higher concentrations in more urban, polluted locations.

Pesticides
Today, organophosphates make up about 50% of the killing agents in chemical pesticides.

Organophosphate pesticides (OPPs), like some nerve agents, inhibit acetylcholinesterase (IRAC mode of action 1b), which is broadly essential for normal function in insects, but also in humans and many other animals. OPPs affect this enzyme in varied ways, a principal one being through irreversible covalent inhibition, and so create potentials for poisoning that vary in degree. The brain sends out neurotransmitters to the nerve endings in the body; organophosphates disrupt this process from occurring. This chemical, organophosphate works by disrupting the enzyme acetylcholinesterase. Acetylcholinesterase breaks down the acetylcholine neurotransmitter, which sends out signals to other nerve endings in the body.

For instance, parathion, one of the first OPPs commercialized, is many times more potent than malathion, an insecticide used in combating the Mediterranean fruit fly (Med-fly) and West Nile virus-transmitting mosquitoes. Human and animal exposure to them can be through ingestion of foods containing them, or via absorption through the skin or lungs.

The human and animal toxicity of OPPs make them a societal health and environmental concern; the EPA banned most residential uses of organophosphates in 2001, but their agricultural use, as pesticides on fruits and vegetables, is still permitted, as is their use in mosquito abatement in public spaces such as parks. For instance, the most commonly used OPP in the U.S., malathion, sees wide application in agriculture, residential landscaping, and pest control programs (including mosquito control in public recreation areas). As of 2010, forty such OPPs were registered for use in the U.S., with at least 73 million pounds used in one time period in agricultural and residential settings. Commonly used organophosphates have included:

 parathion
 malathion 
 methyl parathion
 chlorpyrifos
 diazinon
 dichlorvos
 phosmet
 fenitrothion 
 tetrachlorvinphos
 azamethiphos
 azinphos-methyl
 terbufos

Studies have shown that prolonged exposure to OPPs—e.g., in the case of farm workers—can lead to health problems, including increased risks for cardiovascular and respiratory disease, and cancer. In the case of pregnant women, exposure can result in premature births. In addition, permanent damage to the brain's chemical make-up, and changes in human behavior and emotion can occur to the fetus in pregnant women.

Organophosphate pesticides degrade rapidly by hydrolysis on exposure to sunlight, air, and soil, although small amounts can be detected in food and drinking water. Organophosphates contaminate drinking water by moving through the soil to the ground water. When the pesticide degrades, it is broken down into several chemicals. Organophosphates degrade faster than the organochlorides.  The greater acute toxicity of OPPs results in the elevated risk associated with this class of compounds (see the Toxicity section below).

Nerve agents

History
Early pioneers in the field include Jean Louis Lassaigne (early 19th century) and Philippe de Clermont (1854). In 1932, German chemist Willy Lange and his graduate student, Gerde von Krueger, first described the cholinergic nervous system effects of organophosphates, noting a choking sensation and a dimming of vision after exposure on themselves, which they attributed to the esters themselves. This discovery later inspired German chemist Gerhard Schrader at company IG Farben in the 1930s to experiment with these compounds as insecticides. Their potential use as chemical warfare agents soon became apparent, and the Nazi government put Schrader in charge of developing organophosphate (in the broader sense of the word) nerve gases. Schrader's laboratory discovered the G series of weapons, which included Sarin, Tabun, and Soman. The Nazis produced large quantities of these compounds, though did not use them during World War II. British scientists experimented with a cholinergic organophosphate of their own, called diisopropylfluorophosphate, during the war. The British later produced VX nerve agent, which was many times more potent than the G series, in the early 1950s, almost 20 years after the Germans had discovered the G series.

After World War II, American companies gained access to some information from Schrader's laboratory, and began synthesizing organophosphate pesticides in large quantities. Parathion was among the first marketed, followed by malathion and azinphosmethyl. The popularity of these insecticides increased after many of the organochlorine insecticides such as DDT, dieldrin, and heptachlor were banned in the 1970s.

Structural features
Effective organophosphates have the following structural features:

 A terminal oxygen connected to phosphorus by a double bond, i.e. a phosphoryl group
 Two lipophilic groups bonded to the phosphorus
 A leaving group bonded to the phosphorus, often a halide

Fine tuning
Within these requirements, a large number of lipophilic and leaving groups have been used. The variation of these groups is one means of fine tuning the toxicity of the compound. A good example of this chemistry are the P-thiocyanate compounds which use an aryl (or alkyl) group and an alkylamino group as the lipophilic groups. The thiocyanate is the leaving group.

Flame retardants 
Flame retardants (FRs) are chemicals that have been used on diverse consumer materials to prevent combustion and to delay the spread of fire after ignition. The increased demand to satisfy fire safety standards for flammability of plastic materials used in devices and appliances along with the strict regulation of brominated flame retardants has driven the high volume of production and consumption of OPEs. Most flame retardants used are halogenated OPEs, and the effectiveness of the flame retardant increases with the increased number of halogenated substituents.

OPEs are utilized as additive flame retardants which means the concentration of these flame retardants decreases with time as they readily leak into the environment. There are several mechanisms flame retardants use to prevent fire, however the most effective ones are the gas phase and the solid phase reactions. In the solid phase, halogenated flame retardants produce a char layer on burning materials suffocating the combustion, as well as in the gas phase they remove H+ and OH− radicals from the flammable gasses, by reaction with the Br and Cl atoms to further slow down the burning process. Non-halogenated OPEs are effective mainly in the solid phase of burning materials. Upon exposure to heat the phosphorus compounds react to form a polymeric form of phosphorous acid. The acid causes a char layer that covers the burning material, blocking it from contact with oxygen, which in turn slows down the combustion reaction.

Health effects

Poisoning

Many "organophosphates" are potent nerve agents, functioning by inhibiting the action of acetylcholinesterase (AChE) in nerve cells. They are one of the most common causes of poisoning worldwide, and are frequently intentionally used in suicides in agricultural areas. Organophosphate pesticides can be absorbed by all routes, including inhalation, ingestion, and dermal absorption. Their inhibitory effects on the acetylcholinesterase enzyme lead to a pathological excess of acetylcholine in the body. Their toxicity is not limited to the acute phase, however, and chronic effects have long been noted. Neurotransmitters such as acetylcholine (which is affected by organophosphate pesticides) are profoundly important in the brain's development, and many organophosphates have neurotoxic effects on developing organisms, even from low levels of exposure. Other organophosphates are not toxic, yet their main metabolites, such as their oxons, are. Treatment includes both a pralidoxime binder and an anticholinergic such as atropine.

Chronic toxicity
Repeated or prolonged exposure to organophosphates may result in the same effects as acute exposure including the delayed symptoms. Other effects reported in workers repeatedly exposed include impaired memory and concentration, disorientation, severe depression, irritability, confusion, headache, speech difficulties, delayed reaction times, nightmares, sleepwalking, drowsiness, or insomnia. An influenza-like condition with headache, nausea, weakness, loss of appetite, and malaise has also been reported.

The physiological difference of OPEs in size and polarity greatly influences the physical and biochemical toxicity of the compound group.  The chemical structures of OP triesters used as flame retardants and plasticizers are essentially similar to those of OP insecticides that target the nervous system of insects. Multiple toxicological studies have shown that OPEs such as TBOEP, TCIPP, TDCIPP, triethyl phosphate (TEP), and tris(methylphenyl)phosphate (TMPP) elicit effects on embryonic development, mRNA expression, thyroid hormones, circulating bile acid concentrations, and the neurological system in fish, birds, rodents, and/or humans.

Low-level exposure
Even at relatively low levels, organophosphates may be hazardous to human health. These pesticides act on acetylcholinesterase, an enzyme found in the brain. Thus, fetuses and young children, whose brain development depends on a strict sequence of biological events, may be most at risk. They can be absorbed through the lungs or skin or by eating them on food. According to a 2008 report from the U.S. Department of Agriculture, ″detectable″  traces of organophosphate were found in a representative sample of produce tested by the agency, 28% of frozen blueberries, 20% of celery, 27% of green beans, 17% of peaches, 8% of broccoli, and 25% of strawberries.

Cancer

The United States Environmental Protection Agency lists parathion as a possible human carcinogen.  The International Agency for Research on Cancer (IARC), found that some organophosphates may increase cancer risk. Tetrachlorvinphos and parathion were classified as "possibly carcinogenic", whereas malathion and diazinon were classified as probably carcinogenic to humans.

Health effects on children

A 2013 review of 27 studies on prenatal and early childhood exposures to organophosphate pesticides found all but one showed negative  neurodevelopmental outcomes. In the ten  studies that assessed prenatal exposure, "cognitive deficits (related to working memory) were found in children at age 7 years, behavioral deficits (related to attention) seen mainly in toddlers, and motor deficits (abnormal reflexes), seen mainly in neonates."

A  systematic review of neurodevelopmental effects of prenatal and postnatal organophosphate pesticide exposure was done in 2014.  The review found that "Most of the studies evaluating prenatal exposure observed a negative effect on mental development and an increase in attention problems in preschool and school children."

In the US the organophosphate phosmet was banned for use on household fruit trees, ornamentals, and domestic pets in 2001 as other pesticides became available for these uses. Many other uses of phosmet were still allowed, especially commercial ones.

Affected populations
According to the EPA, organophosphate use in 2004 accounts for 40% of all insecticide products used in the United States. Out of concerns for potential hazards of organophosphate exposure to child development, the EPA began phasing out forms of organophosphates used indoors in 2001. While it is used in forestry, urban, and public health spraying (mosquito abatement programs, etc.) as well, the general population has been observed to have low exposure. Thus, the primary affected population that faces exposure to organophosphates are farmworkers, especially those in countries that have fewer restrictions on its usage, such as in India.

Farmworkers in the United States
In the United States, migrant and seasonal farmworkers are the most susceptible to organophosphate exposure. Of the U.S. farmworker population, there are about 4.2 million seasonal or migrant men, women, and even children, 70% of whom are born in Mexico and an overwhelming 90% majority of these are Latino. This almost homogenous racial aspect of employment in farm work in the United States highly suggests social, economic, and political factors undercurrents that would explain their vulnerability. Half of the farmworker population in the United States do not have legal documentation and two thirds live in poverty, making it difficult to fully understand and document the characteristics of this population with relative certainty. Furthermore, the group faces linguistic barriers, with about 70% of the migrant seasonal farmworker population reporting that they cannot speak English well. 

In the United States, poverty and lack of documentation status puts migrant farmworkers in housing situations that make them far more likely to contract infectious or parasitic diseases and to suffer from chemical related ailments than the general U.S. population. Field workers who are exposed to pesticides continue to further expose their families in their residences, especially through contaminated clothing in which the residue settles as house dust.  Increased rates of a full range of adverse birth outcomes result from high exposure to pesticides in a study of 500,000 births among farm workers in California's San Joaquin Valley.

Economic, social, racial, and political barriers make passing policy and creating protective measures less likely to occur; in the context of their jobs, migrant seasonal farm workers are structurally vulnerable to exploitation and working conditions that are Occupational Factors not up to health standards if they are unable to find the necessary physical and social resources to protect themselves.    

The nature of their job may require constant exposure to toxins and pesticides and subjects them to increasingly extreme weather as climate change progresses. Thus, migrant farm work has been ranked conservatively as possibly the second most dangerous job in the country.

Regulatory efforts
Organophosphates (OPs) were among the most widely used insecticides until the 21st century. And until the mid 1990s, general pesticide regulation was dependent on the Federal Food, Drug and Cosmetic Act (FFDCA) and the Federal Insecticide, Fungicide, and Rodenticide Act (FIFRA) passed in 1938 and 1947, respectively.  In 1993, the Environmental Protection Agency (EPA) was bound by a pledge made to Congress to significantly reduce the amount of pesticides used in the United States, and the U.S. Department of Agriculture, along with the Food and Drug Administration, joined the EPA in this commitment. Then, in 1996, The Food Quality Protection Act (FQPA) was signed into law to strengthen the regulation of pesticide in food and make regulation practices more consistent. One way that this strengthening was accomplished was through mandating aggregate and cumulative exposure risk assessments in derivative food tolerance levels. The EPA selected OPs as the first class of pesticides for assessing food tolerances because of their specific toxicity behavior as acetylcholinesterase inhibitors.

Between 1996 and 1999, the use of OPs actually increased (despite the passing of the FQPA) from 75 million to 91 million pounds per year. However, this is mainly due to the cotton boll weevil eradication program through the U.S Department of Agriculture and the use of OPs eventually decreased to 46 million pounds per year by 2004. The residential use of OP pesticides may have declined more quickly, when compared to commercial use, largely due to the voluntary cancellation of chlorpyrifos and diazinon as approved pesticides for home use. The phaseout of both chlorpyrifos and diazinon for most residential uses was complete in 2005.

Parathion (Ethyl) use is banned or restricted in 23 countries and its import is illegal in a total of 50 countries. Its use was banned in the U.S. in 2000 and it has not been used since 2003.

In 2001, the EPA placed new restrictions on the use of the organophosphates phosmet and azinphos-methyl to increase protection of agricultural workers. The crop uses reported at that time as being phased out in four years included those for almonds, tart cherries, cotton, cranberries, peaches, pistachios, and walnuts. The crops with time-limited registration included apples/crab apples, blueberries, sweet cherries, pears, pine seed orchards, brussels sprouts, cane berries, and the use of azinphos-methyl by nurseries for quarantine requirements. The labeled uses of phosmet include alfalfa, orchard crops (e.g. almonds, walnuts, apples, cherries), blueberries, citrus, grapes, ornamental trees (not for use in residential, park, or recreational areas) and nonbearing fruit trees, Christmas trees and conifers (tree farms), potatoes, and peas. Azinphos-methyl has been banned in Europe since 2006.

In May 2006, the Environmental Protection Agency (EPA) reviewed the use of dichlorvos and proposed its continued sale, despite concerns over its safety and considerable evidence suggesting it is carcinogenic and harmful to the brain and nervous system, especially in children. Environmentalists charge that the latest decision was the product of backroom deals with industry and political interference.

As of 2013, thirty-six types of organophosphates were registered for use in the United States. Organophosphates are currently used in a variety of environments (e.g. agriculture, gardens and veterinary practices), however, several notable OPs have been discontinued for use. This includes parathion, which is no longer registered for any use, and chlorpyrifos (as mentioned previously), which is no longer registered for home use. And again, other than for agricultural use, the OP diazinon has been banned in the U.S.

See also
 Activity-based protein profiling using organophosphate-containing activity-based probes
 Pesticide toxicity to bees
 Toxic oil syndrome
 Cholinesterase inhibitor

Further reading

References

External links
.
 ATSDR Case Studies in Environmental Medicine: Cholinesterase Inhibitors, Including Pesticides and Chemical Warfare Nerve Agents U.S. Department of Health and Human Services
 Organophosphates - an article by Frances M Dyro, MD
 NYTimes: E.P.A. Recommends Limits On Thousands of Pesticides
 EPA OP pesticide site
 Epidemiological study of the relationships between exposure to organophosphate pesticides and indices of chronic peripheral neuropathy, and neuropsychological abnormalities in sheep farmers and dippers. Phase 3 Report Institute of Occupational Medicine TM/99/02c
 Epidemiological study of the relationships between exposure to organophosphate pesticides and indices of chronic peripheral neuropathy, and neuropsychological abnormalities in sheep farmers and dippers. Phase 2 Report Institute of Occupational Medicine TM/99/0b
 Epidemiological study of the relationships between exposure to organophosphate pesticides and indices of chronic peripheral neuropathy, and neuropsychological abnormalities in sheep farmers and dippers. Phase 1 Report Institute of Occupational Medicine TM/99/0a

 
Phosphorus(V) compounds
Anticholinesterases